Bangestan (also Romanized as Bangestān; also known as Bangestān-e Bālā and Tangestān) is a village in Howmeh-ye Sharqi Rural District, in the Central District of Ramhormoz County, Khuzestan Province, Iran. At the 2006 census, its population was 264, in 53 families.

References 

Populated places in Ramhormoz County